The women's triple jump event at the 2007 Summer Universiade was held on 13 August.

Results

References
Results
Final results

Triple
2007 in women's athletics
2007